Shin Yung-kyoo (30 March 1942 – 18 March 1996) was a North Korean football defender who played for North Korea in the 1966 FIFA World Cup. He also played for Moranbong Sports Team.

References

1942 births
1996 deaths
North Korean footballers
North Korea international footballers
Association football defenders
Moranbong Sports Club players
1966 FIFA World Cup players
People's Athletes